Whakatāne Airport  is an airport serving the town of Whakatāne, New Zealand, the Eastern Bay of Plenty and the tourist attractions of Mount Tarawera and White Island.

History
The airport opened on 24 January 1963 with a new sealed runway and a construction cost of 50,000 pounds. It had a 250m runway end safety area (RESA) added to allow larger aircraft such as Saab 340 to land.

Air Chathams operates daily flights to Auckland with a Fairchild Swearingen Metroliner.

The airport houses a flight school, agricultural aircraft, fixed wing tourist flights and commercial helicopter operations.

The "excitingly different" terminal building was designed by Roger Walker and completed in 1974. In 2019, Heritage New Zealand listed the airport terminal as a Category I Historic Place.
Air Chathams began serving Whakatāne with the Saab 340 on 29 November 2019.

Airlines and destinations

See also

 List of airports in New Zealand
 List of airlines of New Zealand
 Transport in New Zealand

References

External links
Whakatāne District Council - Airport Information
Whakatāne Information

Airports in New Zealand
Transport in the Bay of Plenty Region
Buildings and structures in the Bay of Plenty Region
Whakatāne
Heritage New Zealand Category 1 historic places in the Bay of Plenty Region
Transport buildings and structures in the Bay of Plenty Region